Grismer's bent-toed gecko (Cyrtodactylus grismeri)  is a species of lizard in the family Gekkonidae. The species is endemic  to southwestern Vietnam.

Etymology
The specific name, grismeri, is in honor of American herpetologist Larry Lee Grismer.

References

Cyrtodactylus
Reptiles described in 2008